Park Mary Historic District is a national historic district located at Lafayette, Tippecanoe County, Indiana.  The district encompasses 106 contributing buildings and 1 contributing structure in a predominantly residential section of Lafayette.  It developed between about 1853 and 1950 and includes representative examples of Italianate, Queen Anne, and Bungalow / American Craftsman style architecture. Notable contributing buildings include the Thomas Hull House (1870), Fry House (1873), Perrin House (1868), Fletmeyer House (1881), Keipner House (1885), Behm House (1858), Greagor House (1873), Ulrick House, John and William Levering House (1858), Sawyer House (1868), Lafayette Christian Reformed Church (1929), Lincoln School (1923), and Lafayette Armory (1927).

It was listed on the National Register of Historic Places in 2001.

See also
Centennial Neighborhood District
Downtown Lafayette Historic District
Ellsworth Historic District
Highland Park Neighborhood Historic District
Jefferson Historic District
Ninth Street Hill Neighborhood Historic District
Perrin Historic District
St. Mary Historic District
Upper Main Street Historic District

References

External links

Historic districts on the National Register of Historic Places in Indiana
Bungalow architecture in Indiana
Italianate architecture in Indiana
Queen Anne architecture in Indiana
Neighborhoods in Lafayette, Indiana
Historic districts in Lafayette, Indiana
National Register of Historic Places in Tippecanoe County, Indiana